A Pert Cyclic Omen is the debut album of Electric Company, released on August 8, 1995, on Onion/American Recordings.

Track listing

Personnel 
Brad Laner – instruments, production

References 

1995 debut albums
American Recordings (record label) albums
Electric Company (band) albums